Socratis Otto is an Australian film, theatre and television actor. He is best known for his roles in television series Young Lions as Justin Carmody, Home and Away as Robert Robertson, and Wentworth as Maxine Conway.

Early life
Otto is the son of first-generation Greek immigrants, and was born and raised in Sydney, New South Wales. He completed a degree in creative writing and literature before studying acting at NIDA (National Institute of Dramatic Art), graduating in 2000.

Career

Theatre
Otto began his career in the 2001 Sydney Theatre Company's play Salt.

Television
Otto had a guest role in Australian children's television series Outriders in 2001 followed by a leading role in drama series Young Lions in 2002 as Justin Carmody.

In 2009, Otto played the lead role of Charles Darwin in drama-documentary Darwin's Brave New World.

He appeared in television series Dance Academy in 2010 as Adam the Psychologist and in 2011 had a guest stint on Home and Away as Detective Robert Robertson.
This was followed by guest roles in television series Rake, The Doctor Blake Mysteries and Serangoon Road.

In 2013, he appeared in the mini-series Paper Giants: Magazine Wars as Peter Dawson and in the 2014 telemovie Carlotta as Christopher.

In 2014 to 2017 he joined the cast of Wentworth in the role of trans woman prison inmate Maxine Conway (formerly Max).

Otto made later television appearances in Operation Buffalo, ReCancelled and more.Otto also acted in and directed the mini series HomeSpun.

Film
Otto appeared in the 2003 movie The Matrix Reloaded. This was followed by X-Men Origins: Wolverine, The Rage in Placid Lake and Beautiful.

Filmography

Film

Television

Video games

References

External links

Socratis Otto on Instagram 

1973 births
Living people
Australian male film actors
Australian male soap opera actors
Australian male stage actors
Male actors from Sydney
Australian people of Greek descent
20th-century Australian male actors
21st-century Australian male actors